Congregation Anshai Emeth is a reform synagogue located in Peoria, Illinois, established in 1859. The synagogue is the second oldest Jewish congregation in Illinois, and as of 2019 has the largest membership of any Jewish congregation in Peoria.

As of 1994, Congregation Agudas Achim, the Peoria traditional Jewish congregation, was invited to move into the building housing Anshai Emeth as well. This in addition to the Peoria Hebrew Day School, a private Jewish school that is housed in the lower half the building, established in 1971. It has been the spiritual home of many notable Jewish Peorians, such as Betty Friedan and Susan G. Komen (as well as her family, parents Marvin and Eleanor Goodman, and widower Stanley Komen).

History
Anshai Emeth was founded when several Jewish families in the Peoria area, immigrants from Western Europe affiliated with the Reform movement, came together to establish an organized religious community. At first they gathered in either members houses or various buildings around Peoria, and in 1863 they purchased a former Presbyterian church as the first synagogue in Peoria. On October 2, 1874, new Jewish immigrants from Russia, Poland and Hungary affiliated with the Orthodox movement left Anshai Emeth to found their own congregation, named Beth Israel. After years of tensions between the two synagogues, in 1886 the two were united again, with Beth Israel selling their building and turning over their accounts to Anshai Emeth. Members of the community who did not wish to join the Reform congregation continued to hold services on their own where they could. That community would later create Congregation Agudas Achim, at first affiliated with the Orthodox movement.

References

Reform synagogues in Illinois
Synagogues in Illinois
Buildings and structures in Peoria, Illinois